The Kopenhagener Straße is a street in Berlin's Prenzlauer Berg district, which runs parallel to the Ringbahn tracks between busy Schönhauser Allee in the east all the way to the Mauerpark in the west, where the Berlin Wall separated the Soviet from the French sector.  The street was named on 30 April 1899 after the Danish capital Copenhagen.

At a length of 800 metres (one-half mile) it features a nearly complete row of 61 apartment buildings built in the Jugendstil period with four modern houses and playgrounds in between.  From east to west it is intersected by Rhinower Straße, then crossed by Sonnenburger Straße, by Ystader Straße and finally ends at Schwedter Straße at the northern end of the Mauerpark.  At Sonnenburger Straße the Schönfließer Brücke, built in 1908 according to plans by Alfred Grenander, crossed the Ringbahn railway towards the north up until the end of World War II. The bridge was damaged by a bomb in the Allied attack on 3 February 1945, and removed completely at the end of the 1950s. The house at Kopenhagener Straße 17 was destroyed in the process, and parts of it blocked the bridge.  As a replacement, a 60 m (200 ft) long pedestrian bridge was installed right beside during the governance of the German Democratic Republic (GDR) in the early 1960s. Between 1945 and at least 1954 a provisional instalment bridged the railway tracks towards the undestroyed (major) part of the Schönfließer Brücke.

A study prepared by the geography department at the Humboldt University of Berlin counted 45 artists in the street, making this one of Berlin's significant creative functional clusters. Further one finds very many cafés, restaurants, bars and the infamous Mittwochsclub (Wednesday Club, located in the cellar under the Kohlenquelle Café in No. 16). The most obvious structure in the street is the former Humboldt transformer station at No. 61 (on the corner of Sonnenburger Straße), that was planned by the renowned German industrial architect Hans Heinrich Müller. An experimental urban children's farm (the Moritzhof) is located at the western end of the Kopenhagener Straße, providing the surreal view of horses and goats against a backdrop of dense urban housing and the Fernsehturm.

The Kopenhagener Straße was inhabited by artists and bohemians much before German reunification. Despite the renovation and revival of the majority of the buildings since the fall of the Berlin Wall in 1989, the cobblestone street at the northern rim of Berlin's city centre has maintained its pre-unification calm and creative charm.  For this reason the Kopenhagener Straße was selected as the movie set for several movies that indulge in GDR Ostalgie, for example Der Rote Kakadu and Sommer vorm Balkon. Aside from artists, many actors, authors and architects also have made the street their home or place of work.  Approximately half of the current residents lived in the street before reunification. Newer inhabitants are mostly from former West Germany and other European countries.

External links 

 Transformer Station Kopenhagener Straße
 Kinderbauernhof im Mauerpark
 Roter Kakadu Official Movie Page
 Sommer Vorm Balkon Official Movie Page

Sources 
 Die Kulturmeile - Raum für Kunst in der Kopenhagener Straße, Tagesspiegel 20 November 2006

References 
 Katja Adelhof, HU-Berlin, 2006 Untersuchung zu "Räumlichen Clustern" u.a. in der Kopenhagener Straße

Cobbled streets
Pankow
Restaurant districts and streets in Germany
Streets in Berlin
Art Nouveau architecture in Berlin
Ostalgie